The 2016 Summer Olympics women's basketball tournament in Rio de Janeiro, began on 6 August and ended on 20 August 2016.

The United States won their eighth total and sixth consecutive gold medal by defeating Spain 101–72 in the final.				
Serbia captured their first bronze medal after beating France 70–63.

The medals were presented by Patrick Baumann of Switzerland, Sir Philip Craven of Great Britain, Angela Ruggiero of the United States of America, and members of the International Olympic Committee, while the gifts were presented by Horacio Muratore, Lena Wallin Kantzy, José Luis Sáez, and the President and Central Board Members of FIBA.

Competition schedule

Qualification

Squads

Each NOC was limited to one team per tournament. Each team had a roster of twelve players, one of which could be a naturalized player.

Referees
The following referees were selected for the tournament.

 Carlos Júlio
 Leandro Lezcano
 Scott Beker
 Vaughan Mayberry
 Guilherme Locatelli
 Cristiano Maranho
 Karen Lasuik
 Stephen Seibel
 Duan Zhu
 Sreten Radović
 Natalia Cuello
 Eddie Viator
 Robert Lottermoser
 Anne Panther
 Christos Christodoulou
 Nadege Zouzou
 Hwang In-tae
 Oļegs Latiševs
 José Reyes
 Chahinaz Boussetta
 Ahmed Al-Bulushi
 Ferdinand Pascual
 Piotr Pastusiak
 Roberto Vázquez
 Ilija Belošević
 Damir Javor
 Juan Carlos García
 Carlos Peruga
 Borys Ryzhyk
 Steven Anderson

Draw
The draw was held at the FIBA Headquarters, also known as the "House of Basketball" in Mies, Switzerland on 11 March 2016. As the five winners of the 2016 FIBA World Olympic Qualifying Tournament for Women (OQT) were yet to be known, they were assigned placeholders as "OQT 1", "OQT 2", "OQT 3", "OQT 4" and "OQT 5". These were the pot assignments:

Group A was assigned with OQT 1, OQT 3 and OQT 5, while Group B had OQT 2 and OQT 4.

Group stage
All times are local (UTC−3).

Group A

Group B

Knockout stage

Bracket

Quarterfinals

Semifinals

Bronze medal game

Gold medal game

Statistical leaders

Individual statistical leaders

Points

Rebounds

Assists

Blocks

Steals

Individual game highs

Final ranking
Rankings are determined by:
1st–4th
Results of gold and bronze medal games.
5th–8th:
Win–loss record in the preliminary round group
Standings in the preliminary round group (i.e. Group A's #3 is ranked higher than Group B's #4.)
9th–10th and 11th–12th:
5th placers in the preliminary round groups are classified 9th–10th; 6th placers classified *11th–12th
Win–loss record in the preliminary round group

References

External links
Official website

 
2016
Women's basketball
International women's basketball competitions hosted by Brazil
2016 in women's basketball
Women's events at the 2016 Summer Olympics